Victor Manuel Oyarzún Venegas (born 18 June 1980) was a Chilean footballer. 

He played for Deportes Antofagasta.

Honours

Player
Deportes Antofagasta
 Primera B (1): 2011 Apertura

References
 
 

1980 births
Living people
Chilean footballers
Cobresal footballers
Puerto Montt footballers
C.D. Antofagasta footballers
Deportes Temuco footballers
Chilean Primera División players
Primera B de Chile players
Association football defenders
People from Los Lagos Region